Verrill is an English surname. Notable people with the surname include:

Addison Emery Verrill (1839–1926), American zoologist, museum curator, and professor
Alpheus Hyatt Verrill (1871–1954), American archaeologist, explorer, inventor, illustrator, and author
Louise Brown Verrill  (1870–1948), American composer

Surnames of English origin